The men's doubles competition at the 2023 FIL European Luge Championships was held on 14 January 2023.

Results
The first run was held at 10:06 and the second run at 11:30.

References

Men's doubles